Year 133 (CXXXIII) was a common year starting on Wednesday (link will display the full calendar) of the Julian calendar. At the time, it was known as the Year of the Consulship of Hiberus and Sisenna (or, less frequently, year 886 Ab urbe condita). The denomination 133 for this year has been used since the early medieval period, when the Anno Domini calendar era became the prevalent method in Europe for naming years.

Events 
 By place 
 Roman Empire 
 Bar Kokhba Revolt: Sextus Julius Severus, Roman governor of Britain, is sent to Judea (in 136 renamed Syria Palaestina) to quell the revolt. Jewish rebels, led by Simon bar Kokhba and Eleazar, cut off the vital supply lines and Roman garrisons in Palestine. Despite Roman reinforcements from Syria and Egypt, they establish an independent state in Judea.

Births 
 January 30 – Didius Julianus, Roman emperor (according to Cassius Dio) (d. 193)
 Athenagoras of Athens, Greek Christian apologist (d. 190)
 Bian Zhang, Chinese general, official (d. 186)

Deaths 
 Cyriacus,  bishop of Jerusalem (approximate date)

References